Michael LaBerge is a retired American soccer goalkeeper.  LaBerge was the 1996 USISL Premier League Goalkeeper of the Year and played professionally in the USL A-League.

In 1993, LaBerge played for Yavapai College.  He then transferred to the University of Evansville where he played out the last three years of his collegiate eligibility.  In 1995, during the collegiate off-season, LaBerge played for the Colorado Springs Stampede of the USISL Premier League.  He played for them again in 1996 and was named the 1996 USISL Premier League Goalkeeper of the Year  In 1997, LaBerge turned professional with the Nashville Metros of the USISL A-League, spending two seasons with them.  He finished his professional career with the Hershey Wildcats in 2000.

References

Living people
1975 births
American soccer players
Evansville Purple Aces men's soccer players
Hershey Wildcats players
Nashville Metros players
USL League Two players
A-League (1995–2004) players
Yavapai Roughriders men's soccer players
Association football goalkeepers